"She Bop" is a song by American singer-songwriter Cyndi Lauper, released as the third single from her debut studio album, She's So Unusual (1983). It reached number three on the US Billboard Hot 100 chart in September 1984. Worldwide, the song is her third most commercially successful single after "Girls Just Want to Have Fun" and "Time After Time", and also reached number 46 on the UK Singles Chart and number six on the ARIA Singles Chart. "She Bop" was Lauper's third consecutive top 5 on the Hot 100. She recorded a quieter version of the song for her 2005 album The Body Acoustic.

Theme
The song was considered controversial, as it dealt with masturbation. It was included on the Parents Music Resource Center's "Filthy Fifteen" list, due to its sexual lyrics; this led to the creation of the Parental Advisory sticker. Lauper told The Howard Stern Show she recorded the vocals while nude. She has stated that finding a copy of gay men's magazine Blueboy lying around in the recording studio provided the impetus for writing "She Bop". The magazine is mentioned in the first verse. The single has been released in over 32 variations across the world, the most common being a two-track 7" single (with varying covers) and a two-track 12" vinyl single (also with varying covers).

Reception
Cash Box said that "with characteristic zaniness, Lauper takes a be-bop back beat and sparks it with an inspired vocal that pops and chirps with rhythmic intensity."

Chart performance
"She Bop" was released on July 2, 1984. It debuted on the Billboard Hot 100 at No. 52 in the issue dated July 21, 1984, and spent a total of 18 weeks on the chart, reaching a peak position of No. 3 in the issue dated September 8, 1984. It was the third single from Lauper's debut album to make the top 10 of the Hot 100. The single also reached number 10 on the Hot Dance/Club Play Songs chart the week of September 15, 1984, and placed at 34 on the Billboard year-end chart of 1984. On April 17, 1989, the song was certified gold by the Recording Industry Association of America (RIAA) for the shipment of half a million copies across the United States.

Music video
The accompanying music video for "She Bop" was directed by Edd Griles. Mark Marek designed the characters in the animated sections of this music video, which were produced and directed by Jerry Lieberman, of NYC's Jerry Lieberman Productions, and the cover of the US 12" version. Wendi Richter and Lou Albano appear in the video, with Richter lip-synching the first line of the song.

The video expands upon the references to masturbation in the song's lyrics, although not overtly. Among the images presented are an upright bottle shooting mayonnaise into the air, a sign at a gas station that displays 'GIT OFF HERE', gas pumps (labelled 'good x', 'better xx', 'nirvana xxx', 'single', and 'multiple'), a large sign that reads "Self Service", a dance sequence where Lauper portrays a blind person with a cane, and that same person winning a game of "Masterbingo"– both a reference to the myth that masturbation causes blindness. Most of the more blatant references appear during the animated instrumental sequence, although subtle images are seen throughout the live action scenes.

At the 1985 MTV Video Music Awards, the video was nominated for "Best Female Video", but lost to Tina Turner's "What's Love Got to Do with It".

Formats and track listings
 US/UK 7" single
 "She Bop" – 3:47
 "Witness" – 3:40

 US 12" single
 "She Bop" (Special Dance Mix) – 6:16
 "She Bop" (Instrumental) – 6:30

 UK 12" single
 "She Bop" (Special Dance Mix) – 6:16
 "She Bop" (Instrumental) – 5:20 (stated)
 "Witness" – 3:40

Official versions
 Album version – 3:42
 Single version – 3:47 (7" single)
 Special dance mix – 6:27 (12" single)
 Instrumental – 5:21 (12" single)
 Video mix – 4:35 (Philippines 7" single)
 Live at Le Zenith (Recorded 1987) – 5:12 (From Heading West UK single – CD & 12" versions)
 Live at Irvine Meadows (Recorded 1983) – 5:20 (From She's So Unusual 2000 CD reissue)
 The Body Acoustic Version – 4:16 (From The Body Acoustic)
 Live (True Colors Live 2008) – 3:46 (From True Colors Live 2008 EP)
 Live at the Warehouse, Memphis – 4:04 (From To Memphis, with Love)
 Live (Front and Center Presents) – 3:59 (From Front and Center Presents Cyndi Lauper) (2014)

Charts

Weekly charts

Year-end charts

Certifications

Awards and nominations
Won
 1985 – BMI Awards for Pop Award

Nominations
 1985 – MTV Video Music Award for Best Female Video

Cover versions
 Howie Beno and Cruella DeVille recorded a version of the song for the 1999 movie Jawbreaker
 Hong Kong singer Aaron Kwok recorded a Cantonese and a Mandarin version of the song, both called "絕對美麗".
 Greek band Matisse covered the song for their 2007 album, Toys Up.
 Chilean hard rock band, Betty Black Boots, cover this song in their presentations in the Chilean rock scene.
 In July 2008, J-pop singer Nana Kitade covered "She Bop" for the album We Love Cyndi – Tribute to Cyndi Lauper; another version of the cover was featured on her 2009 album Bondage.
 South Korean pop singer Wax covered the song. Her version of it is called "Oppa", which means "Brother".
 American heavy metal band GWAR performed a version of the song in October 2015 for The A.V. Club A.V. Undercover series, in a medley with The Ramones' "Blitzkrieg Bop".
 Ex-Reuben frontman Jamie Lenman, covered the song for his 2019 album Shuffle.

References

External links
 Cyndi Lauper – She Bop – YouTube – Uploaded by CyndiLauperVEVO

1983 songs
1984 singles
Cyndi Lauper songs
Songs with feminist themes
Songs written by Cyndi Lauper
Masturbation in fiction
Female masturbation
Song recordings produced by Rick Chertoff
Epic Records singles
Songs written by Rick Chertoff
LGBT-related songs